Pierce Butler (judge) (1866–1939) was an associate justice of the Supreme Court of the United States. Justice Butler may also refer to:

Charles C. Butler (1865–1946), associate justice of the Colorado Supreme Court
Fred M. Butler (1854–1932), associate justice of the Vermont Supreme Court
Louis B. Butler (born 1952), associate justice of the Wisconsin Supreme Court
Thomas B. Butler (1806–1873), associate justice of the Connecticut Supreme Court
Turner Butler (1869–1938), associate justice of the Arkansas Supreme Court